Sydney George Davis (19 December 1930 – 10 November 2016) was an  Australian rules footballer who played with South Melbourne in the Victorian Football League (VFL).

Notes

External links 

2016 deaths
1930 births
Australian rules footballers from Victoria (Australia)
Sydney Swans players